Bertin Tomou Bayard (born August 8, 1978) is a Cameroonian former professional footballer who played as a  striker. He represented the Cameroon national team at international level.

Football career
Born in Bafoussam, Tomou started his career at PWD Bamenda, and left for East Asia in 1997. He first played for Pohang Steelers in South Korea, and then went to China in 1998. He received his first  cap for Cameroon in 2004.

He moved to Europe to play for Stade Brestois 29 in Ligue 2 in January 2006.

External links
excelsior.be

1978 births
Living people
Association football forwards
Cameroonian footballers
Cameroonian expatriate footballers
Cameroonian expatriate sportspeople in Belgium
Cameroon international footballers
2008 Africa Cup of Nations players
Pohang Steelers players
Shenzhen F.C. players
Yunnan Hongta players
Zhejiang Professional F.C. players
Guangzhou F.C. players
Xiamen Blue Lions players
Stade Brestois 29 players
Cameroonian expatriate sportspeople in China
Royal Excel Mouscron players
K.V.C. Westerlo players
K.S.V. Roeselare players
K League 1 players
Ligue 2 players
China League One players
Belgian Pro League players
Expatriate footballers in South Korea
Expatriate footballers in China
Expatriate footballers in France
Expatriate footballers in Belgium
Cameroonian expatriate sportspeople in France